The Shrill Beeps of Shrimp was an EP released by Gas Huffer in 1994.

Track listing 
 Side A
 BMX
 Bedtime for Freaky
 Side B
 Boot Check
 Java Jet Pack

Catalog number: MT 271

Gas Huffer albums
1994 EPs